The 2022 Professional Golf Tour of India, titled as the 2022 Tata Steel Professional Golf Tour of India for sponsorship reasons, was the 15th season of the Professional Golf Tour of India and the third in which Official World Golf Ranking points were awarded.

European Tour partnership
In December, it was announced by the European Tour that the Professional Golf Tour of India had entered into a partnership with them and the PGA Tour. As part of the partnership, the leading player on the PGTI Order of Merit was given status onto the European Tour for the following season.

Schedule
The following table lists official events during the 2022 season.

Order of Merit
The Order of Merit was titled as the Tata Steel PGTI Rankings and was based on prize money won during the season, calculated in Indian rupees. The leading player on the tour (not otherwise exempt) earned status to play on the 2023 European Tour.

Notes

References

Professional Golf Tour of India
Professional Golf Tour of India